The following is a list of countries and territories by diamond exports. Data is for 2012, 2015 and 2016 in billions of United States dollars, as reported by The Observatory of Economic Complexity. Currently the countries exporting over one billion dollars in either 2015 or 2016 are listed:

See also
List of countries by diamond production

References

atlas.media.mit.edu - Observatory of Economic complexity - Countries that export Diamonds (2012)
atlas.media.mit.edu - Observatory of Economic complexity - Countries that export Diamonds (2015)
atlas.media.mit.edu - Observatory of Economic complexity - Countries that export Diamonds (2016)

Diamond
exports
Exports